Werner Keller (13 August 1909 in Gut Nutha, Anhalt – 29 February 1980 in Ascona) was a German civil servant, journalist, nonfiction author and anti-Nazi resistance fighter.

He studied engineering and medicine, and then jurisprudence, in Berlin, Rostock, Zürich and Jena. In 1933 he became a Doctor of Jurisprudence.

While working as a senior staff member in Albert Speer's Ministry of Armaments, he saved the lives of many Jews. In 1945 Keller organized an anti-Nazi resistance group in Berlin which briefly ran a pirate radio station and which planned a rather foolhardy attempt on Hitler's life.

He was caught and sentenced by the Nazi Volksgerichtshof  ("People's Court") to death by hanging. In February 1945 high-ranking friends managed, possibly by a bribe, to get his execution put off at the last moment and get him transferred to Fort Zinna, the Wehrmacht prison in Torgau. There, Keller was liberated by American troops of the 69th Infantry Division at the end of April 1945.

After the Second World War, Keller worked as a journalist and a science writer in Hamburg. He has worked for Nordwestdeutscher Rundfunk (The North West German Broadcasting Corporation) and for such papers and magazines as Die Welt, Die Zeit, Stern,  and Neue Illustrierte. He sometimes used the pseudonym 0Norman Alken.”

In 1955 he published The Bible as History, his best-known and most successful book, which correlated the text of the Bible with the results of archaeological diggings in the Middle East, providing, according to Keller, a confirmation for the Bible's veracity which was not dependent on religious faith. It had a circulation of over one million in Germany and has been translated into more than 20 languages, and in 1957 gained him the Italian Literary Prize Premio Bancarella. Among others, it was successfully translated into Hebrew at a time when cultural relations with Germany were far from taken for granted in Israel; the Davar Labour daily in Tel Aviv in 1958 distributed free copies of Keller's book to its subscribers.

Among his other works, the socio-historical book East Minus West Equals Zero, in which the author asserts that all political, scientific and cultural achievements of Russians from medieval times to the onset of the Space Race had their origin in the West, from where they were imported and copied, gained the attention of the Western public. Notion rather contradicted by Ibn-Roshd (Averroes).

Later books by Keller dealt with the history and culture of the Etruscans.

External links 

 
 Article by Werner Keller, Die Zeit, 31. March 1967  

German non-fiction writers
German male journalists
German resistance members
Linguists of Etruscan
1909 births
1980 deaths
German male writers
20th-century German journalists